These are the official results of the Men's 20 kilometres walk event at the 1972 Summer Olympics in Munich. The competition was held on 31  August.  There were no heats with this event, it was held as a finals only event.

Final

References

External links
Official report

Men's 20 kilometres walk
Racewalking at the Olympics
Men's events at the 1972 Summer Olympics